Max Duane Summers (born 1939 in Ohio) is an American molecular biologist and inventor, known for his work on the Baculovirus Expression Vector System (BEVS).

Education and career
Summers graduated in 1962 from Wilmington College with an A.B. in biology. In 1968 he received a PhD in entomology from Purdue University. In the department of botany of the University of Texas he became an assistant professor and then an associate professor. In the department of entomology of Texas A&M University he became in 1977 a full professor, retiring as professor emeritus in 2011.

Gale E. Smith received in 1986 his Ph.D. in molecular biology with Summers as thesis advisor. In 1988 Smith and Summers were granted the key BEVS patent, U.S. Patent No. 4,745,051: "Method for Producing a Recombinant baculovirus Expression Vector", with assignee the Texas A&M University System.

Summers and co-workers demonstrated that mutations of integral membrane proteins expressed within the inner nuclear membrane of the nuclear envelope can cause diseases associated with muscular dystrophies and lipodystrophies. Their research was an important contribution to knowledge of protein targeting with many possible applications to medicine and agricultural pest control.

Summers is the author or co-author of more than 170 articles in academic journals. In 2001 the Institute for Scientific Information (ISI) listed him among the 250 most cited microbiologists in the world. He was an editorial board member of Virology and the executive editor of Protein Expression and Purification.

Awards and honors
 1989 — Member of the National Academy of Sciences
 1989 — Fellow of the American Association for the Advancement of Science
 1991–1992 — President of the American Society for Virology
 1992 — Distinguished Alumni Award from the Purdue University School of Agriculture
 1999 — Gulf Coast Inventor of the Year Award from the Houston Intellectual Property Lawyers' Association
 2009 — 'Father of Baculovirus Expression Technology' Award from  Williamsburg Bioprocessing Foundation (WilBio)

Selected publications

Articles

Pamphlets

Books

References

American microbiologists
American molecular biologists
American virologists
Wilmington College (Ohio) alumni
Purdue University College of Agriculture alumni
University of Texas faculty
Texas A&M University faculty
Fellows of the American Association for the Advancement of Science
Members of the United States National Academy of Sciences
1939 births
Living people